Wine Colored Roses is an album by American country music artist George Jones released in 1986 on the Epic Records label. It peaked at number 5 on the Billboard Country Albums chart. Wine Colored Roses went Gold in 1994.

On Wine Colored Roses, producer Billy Sherrill largely peels back the slicker elements of his 1980s productions, giving the album a more stripped down sound than its predecessor Who's Gonna Fill Their Shoes, something that Sherrill would continue doing for the remainder of Jones's run on Epic.  In his essay for the liner notes to the 1994 Sony compilation The Essential George Jones: The Spirit of Country, Rich Kienzle states, "If there were any doubters, 'Wine Colored Roses' proved Jones was a timeless superstar, even without stimulants."  In a 2001 interview with Jolene Downs, the singer cited the album as one of his all-time favorites, commenting "I loved the songs, it was a really great album."  The title track and "The Right Left Hand", the latter a tribute Jones dedicated to his fourth wife Nancy, were both top ten hits on the Billboard country singles chart.  The album also includes a duet with Patti Page.  AllMusic writes that "this is a comfortable setting for George, and he sings expertly, his surroundings never masking his gossamer phrases."

Track listing

Certifications

References

External links
 George Jones' Official Website
 Record Label

George Jones albums
1986 albums
Albums produced by Billy Sherrill
Epic Records albums